Safdar Ali Khan (died 2 October 1742) was the son of Dost Ali Khan. After the death of his father in the battlefield at Ambur in 1740, he escaped to Vellore. In the same year, he was installed as the Nawab of Arcot by the Marathas.

There was total insecurity in the country during this period and Safdar Ali Khan took every possible measure to save his country and his family. He sent his son's wife to Madras for safety under the protection of the British, who securely lodged them in the Black Town.

But unfortunately he was murdered by his brother-in-law, Murthuza Ali in 1742, who declared himself as the Nawab of Arcot.

Titles held

See also
Nawabs of Arcot

Nawabs of the Carnatic
1742 deaths
Indian Muslims
Year of birth unknown